Waspstrumental is a 2002 instrumental version of XTC's Wasp Star (Apple Venus Volume 2) album released in 2000 by Idea Records.

Track listing

UK CD: IDEACD 006
All songs written by Andy Partridge, except where noted.
"Playground" – 4:19
"Stupidly Happy" – 4:15
"In Another Life" (Colin Moulding) – 3:35
"My Brown Guitar" – 3:52
"Boarded Up" (Moulding) – 3:23
"I'm the Man Who Murdered Love" – 3:48
"We're All Light" – 4:43
"Standing in for Joe" (Moulding) – 3:40
"Wounded Horse" – 4:12
"You and the Clouds Will Still Be Beautiful" – 4:18
"Church of Women" – 5:01
"The Wheel and the Maypole" – 6:06

Personnel
XTC
Colin Moulding – bass guitar
Andy Partridge – guitar

Additional musicians
Caroline Dale – cello
Nick Davis – keyboards
Simon Gardner – flugelhorn
Patrick Kiernan – violin
Peter Lale – viola
Prairie Prince – drums (2, 3, 4, 12)
Chuck Sabo – drums (1, 6, 7, 8, 9, 10, 11)
Kate St. John – oboe
Matt Vaughn – programming
Gavin Wright – violin

Production
Haydn Bendall – recording engineering
Nick Davis – producer, mixing, recording engineering
Simon Dawson – mix engineer
Alan Douglas – recording engineering
Barry Hammond – recording engineering
Ian Cooper at Metropolis – mastering

References

2002 albums
Idea Records albums
Instrumental albums
XTC albums
Albums produced by Nick Davis (record producer)